Brian Roberts (born August 28, 1982 in Los Angeles, California) is a retired American soccer defender who played for the Kansas City Wizards of Major League Soccer.

Player
Roberts played college soccer at Yale University from 2000 to 2003; as a sophomore and a junior, he was named second-team All-Ivy, and as a senior he was named to the first team.  In addition, he started every Yale game during his four-year career at the school.

Upon graduating, Roberts went undrafted, but was signed as a developmental player by the Wizards.  The team promptly loaned him to the A-League's Minnesota Thunder, where he spent all of the 2004 season.  With the Thunder, he appeared in 16 games, playing 1172 minutes from a fullback position, garnering one assist.

Administrative
Following the 2006 season, Roberts retired as a player and joined the Wizards front office as an executive for youth sales.

References

External links
 Brian Roberts profile on MLSNet

1982 births
Living people
American soccer coaches
American soccer players
Major League Soccer players
Minnesota Thunder players
National Premier Soccer League coaches
Sporting Kansas City players
USL First Division players
Yale Bulldogs men's soccer players
Soccer players from California
Association football defenders